The West Gippsland Gazette was a newspaper published in Warragul, Victoria, Australia.

History 
The newspaper was published from 5 July 1898 to 23 December 1930 by A.J. Harvey and Co.

Digitisation 
The newspaper has been digitised and is available via Trove.

References

External links 

 

Defunct newspapers published in Victoria (Australia)
Gippsland (region)
1898 establishments in Australia
1930 disestablishments in Australia